Antonio Jiménez Rangel (born 18 January 1986), simply Rangel, is a Spanish footballer who plays for CD Guadalajara as a central defender.

Club career
Born in La Gineta, Albacete, Castile-La Mancha, Rangel graduated from local Albacete Balompié's youth system, making his senior debuts with the reserves in the 2005–06 season, in Tercera División. On 3 June 2007 he made his professional debut, starting in a 0–0 home draw against Xerez CD, in the Segunda División championship.

In the 2008 summer Rangel left Alba, and competed in Segunda División B but also in the fourth level in the following seasons, representing Sangonera Atlético CF, UD Almansa and UB Conquense. With the latter he achieved promotion at the end of the 2012–13 season, appearing in 33 matches and scoring twice.

On 6 August 2014 Rangel moved to CD Guadalajara, also in the third level.

References

External links

1986 births
Living people
Sportspeople from the Province of Albacete
Spanish footballers
Footballers from Castilla–La Mancha
Association football defenders
Segunda División players
Segunda División B players
Tercera División players
Atlético Albacete players
Albacete Balompié players
UB Conquense footballers
CD Guadalajara (Spain) footballers
UD San Sebastián de los Reyes players